Compsolechia canofusella is a moth of the family Gelechiidae. It was described by Francis Walker in 1864. It is found in Amazonas, Brazil.

Adults are black, the forewings with a submarginal band which is not chalybeous (steel blue), but includes a zigzag chalybeous line. The exterior border is almost straight and slightly oblique. The hindwings are dark cupreous.

References

Moths described in 1864
Compsolechia